The 2017 Big 12 Conference softball tournament was held at ASA Hall of Fame Stadium in Oklahoma City, OK from May 12 through May 13, 2017. It was the first Big 12 softball tournament since 2010. Oklahoma won their fifth conference tournament and earned the Big 12 Conference's automatic bid to the 2017 NCAA Division I softball tournament. 

Oklahoma,  and  received bids to the NCAA tournament.  Oklahoma and Baylor would go on to play in the 2017 Women's College World Series.

Oklahoma went on to win the 2017 National Championship.

Standings
Source:

 Kansas did not participate in the tournament

Schedule
Source:

All-Tournament Team
Source:

References

Big 12 Conference softball tournament
Tournament
Big 12 softball tournament